Colin John Huxford (born 26 May 1944) is an English former footballer who played in the Football League for Swindon Town. A right back, he began his career with Chelsea, and after leaving Swindon he played non-league football for Hillingdon Borough, Ramsgate Athletic and Stevenage Athletic. He also represented England at youth level.

References

1944 births
Living people
People from Stroud
English footballers
Association football defenders
Chelsea F.C. players
Swindon Town F.C. players
Hillingdon Borough F.C. players
Ramsgate F.C. players
Stevenage Athletic F.C. players
English Football League players
Sportspeople from Gloucestershire